Donna W. Finley is an American politician from Maine. Finley, a Republican from Skowhegan, served  for a single two-year term in the Maine House of Representatives (2007-2008). She was defeated for re-election by Democrat Jeff McCabe.

References

Year of birth missing (living people)
Living people
Republican Party members of the Maine House of Representatives
People from Skowhegan, Maine
Women state legislators in Maine
21st-century American women